Agnes Guppy-Volckman (1838–1917) was a British spiritualist medium.

Career

She was born Agnes Elisabeth White in Horncastle, Lincolnshire  not  in Regent's Park, London. She was known as Miss Agnes Nicholl, from an association with William Grinsell Nicholl. She became the wife of the spiritualist Samuel Guppy in 1867. After the death of Guppy in 1875, she married William Volckman.

Guppy-Volckman was discovered by Alfred Russel Wallace in 1866 and managed to dupe him into believing she could communicate with spirits. Volckman was associated with the fraudulent spirit photographer Frederick Hudson. She was known for producing apports and materializations. Researcher Ronald Pearsall described the fraudulent techniques that Guppy-Volckman used in her séances.

John Grant has written that she "was a clever charlatan; her stunts bear all the hallmarks of extravagant stage conjuring tricks."

Molly Whittington-Egan has written a biography of Guppy-Volckman.

Family 
In the 1861 census she was living at 57 Teddington Low Road, Hampton Wick, with William Grinsell Nicholl. He was described as married, a sculptor aged 64, she as  Elizabeth White aged 23 and married was Nicholl's daughter.

On 19 October 1865 she underwent an adult baptism at St Giles in the Fields church, Holborn, giving her first names as Elizabeth Clara White and surname as Nicholl and claiming William Grinsell Nicholl and his wife Emma as her parents. She gave her (correct) date of birth as 22 October 1838, and her address as 29 Great Norfolk Street (near the British Museum).

On December 10, 1867, she married Samuel Guppy at St Luke's church, Chelsea giving her name as Elizabeth White, a spinster, and her father as Charles Taylor White, deceased.

On 1 December 1871 she witnessed the will of William Grinsell Nicholl seven days before his death and while he was still living with his wife of 50 years.

Alleged levitation

On 3 June 1871 it was alleged that Volckman had levitated out of her own house in Highbury three miles away to a séance room table in Lamb's Conduit Street. Although this incident was considered genuine by spiritualists such as Arthur Conan Doyle and A. Campbell Holms, it was dismissed by sceptics as a hoax.

References

Further reading
Anonymous. (1875). Spiritualism Exposed, or Lighting up a Dark Seance. Birmingham.
Molly Whittington-Egan. (2015). Mrs Guppy Takes A Flight: A Scandal of Victorian Spiritualism. Neil Wilson Publishing. 

1838 births
1917 deaths
English spiritual mediums
People from Horncastle, Lincolnshire